General Sir Campbell Claye Grant Ross  (18 May 1824 – 20 June 1892) was a Scottish officer in the British Indian Army. He fought in the Jowaki Expedition.

Ross was born in Saugor, British India, the second son of Lt Col Hugh Ross and Eliza Watson. He was descended from the chiefs of Clan Ross.

He was made a Companion of the Order of the Bath in the 1877 Birthday Honours, at which time he was in the Bengal Staff Corps, and later rose to Knight Commander of that order in 1880.

In 1856, he married Matilda Elderton, daughter of Edward Merrick Elderton. They had 10 children, the eldest of whom was the physician Sir Ronald Ross, winner of the Nobel Prize for medicine. Sir Ronald's grandson David Campbell Ross (born 1934) was named Chief of Clan Ross in 1999.

He died in Eastbourne, aged 68, and was buried at Ocklynge Cemetery.

References

1824 births
1892 deaths
Knights Commander of the Order of the Bath
British Indian Army officers
Campbell Claye Grant